In mathematics, a bundle gerbe is a geometrical model of certain 1-gerbes with connection, or equivalently of a 2-class in Deligne cohomology.

Topology

-principal bundles over a space  (see circle bundle) are geometrical realizations of 1-classes in Deligne cohomology which consist of 1-form connections and 2-form curvatures.

As a cohomology class in Deligne cohomology 
So, we write  for the Deligne-cohomology groups of weight . In the case  the Deligne complex is then
We can understand the Deligne cohomology groups by looking at the Cech resolution giving a double complex. There is also an associated short exact sequence

History 

Historically the most popular construction of a gerbe is a category-theoretic model featured in Giraud's theory of gerbes, which are roughly sheaves of groupoids over M.

In 1994  Murray introduced bundle gerbes, which are geometric realizations of 1-gerbes.
For many purposes these are more suitable for calculations than Giraud's realization, because their construction is entirely within the framework of classical geometry.  In fact, as their name suggests, they are fiber bundles.  This notion was extended to higher gerbes the following year.

Relationship with twisted K-theory

In Twisted K-theory and the K-theory of Bundle Gerbes  the authors defined modules of bundle gerbes and used this to define a K-theory for bundle gerbes.  They then showed that this K-theory is isomorphic to Rosenberg's twisted K-theory, and provides an analysis-free construction.

In addition they defined a notion of twisted Chern character which is a characteristic class for an element of twisted K-theory.  The twisted Chern character is a differential form that represents a class in the twisted cohomology with respect to the nilpotent operator

where  is the ordinary exterior derivative and the twist  is a closed 3-form.  This construction was extended to equivariant K-theory and to holomorphic K-theory by Mathai and Stevenson.

Relationship with field theory

Bundle gerbes have also appeared in the context of conformal field theories.  Gawedzki and Reis have interpreted the Wess–Zumino term in the Wess–Zumino–Witten model (WZW) of string propagation on a group manifold as the connection of a bundle gerbe.  Urs Schreiber,  Christoph Schweigert and Konrad Waldorf have used this construction to extend WZW models to unoriented surfaces and, more generally, the global Kalb–Ramond coupling to unoriented strings.

More details can be found at the n-Category Café:

Bundle Gerbes: General Idea and Definition
Bundle Gerbes: Connections and Surface Transport

See also 

 Gerbe
 Orbifold

Notes

References
Bundle gerbes, by Michael Murray.
Introduction to bundle gerbes, by Michael Murray.
Nonabelian Bundle Gerbes, their Differential Geometry and Gauge Theory, by Paolo Aschieri, Luigi Cantini and Branislav Jurco.
 Bundle gerbes on arxiv.org

In string theory 

 WZW branes and strings

Differential geometry